Leonidas Alcidas Giroux  (July 26, 1885 – September 7, 1936) was a Canadian provincial politician from Alberta. He served as a member of the Legislative Assembly of Alberta sitting with the provincial Liberal caucus in opposition from 1924 until his death in 1936.

Early life
Leonidas Alcidas Giroux was born July 26, 1885 at West Farnham, Quebec to Leonide Giroux and Isabella D'Aragon. He attended Collège de Montréal, University of Paris and the Université catholique de Louvain in Belgium where he completed his post-graduate studies in Philosophy and Economics. He married Marie Irene Shinners on April 10, 1912.

Political career
Giroux ran for a seat to the Alberta Legislature in a by-election held on July 11, 1924 in the electoral district of Grouard. He stood as a candidate for the Alberta Liberals running in a two way contest against United Farmers candidate J.M. Cull. Giroux held the seat for his party winning double the vote count of Cull to earn his first term in office.

Giroux ran for a second term in office less than two years later. when the 1926 Alberta general election was called. He ran for re-election in another two way contest and won easily. He increased his popular vote count by 200 over the by-election.

Giroux ran for a third term in the 1930 Alberta general election. This election saw him run in a hotly contested race against United Farmers candidate Jean Field who served as an original member on the Alberta Eugenics Board. Giroux won the two way race by just under 700 votes.

The 1935 Alberta general election saw the new Social Credit party sweep to power. Giroux was the only opposition candidate in a rural candidate that managed to retain his seat. He won the highest popular vote of his career fending off a strong challenge from two other candidates.

Giroux died on September 7, 1936. He had traveled to Rochester, Minnesota to be treated at the Mayo Clinic for an undisclosed illness and died shortly after his arrival.

References

External links
Legislative Assembly of Alberta Members Listing

Alberta Liberal Party MLAs
Canadian King's Counsel
1936 deaths
Franco-Albertan people
1885 births